Ashland is an unincorporated community in Liberty Township, Henry County, Indiana.

History
Ashland was originally called Mullen's Station. The town was officially renamed Ashland, likely after the city of Ashland, Ohio, in the 1850s. A post office was established as Ashland in 1848, and remained in operation until it was discontinued in 1910.

Geography

References

Unincorporated communities in Henry County, Indiana
Unincorporated communities in Indiana